Larkin–Belber Building, also known as the Larkin Building and Belber Trunk & Bag Company Building, is a historic light manufacturing loft building located in the Logan Square neighborhood of Philadelphia.

History

It was built in 1912–1913, and is a 12-story, reinforced concrete building.  The building has 295,360 square feet of floor space.  Originally designed by Buffalo architect C.J. Heckman for Larkin Company, a soap maker.

In 1920 Belber purchased the building. The company hired local architect Leroy Berman Rothschild to place Belber's own stamp on the building. Rothshild designed large rooftop signs placed along the sides of the building.  In its architecture as well as its integration of manufacturing, office work, and retail functions, the Belber Building represented a "landmark of twentieth century commerce and industry."

Belber vacated the property in 1947 and Robert Hall Clothes took over the property for production. For a few years up to 1964, the building was leased to the Philadelphia Daily News.  In 1983, a developer acquired the building for a conversion to office space; however, those plans did not materialize.  By 2004, the building had maintenance problems that led to pieces breaking off and falling onto the street.  Orens Brothers Inc. acquired the property and converted it to condominiums.

National Register of Historic Places
It was added to the National Register of Historic Places in 2003.

See also
National Register of Historic Places listings in Center City, Philadelphia

References

Industrial buildings and structures on the National Register of Historic Places in Philadelphia
Industrial buildings completed in 1913
Logan Square, Philadelphia
1913 establishments in Pennsylvania
Leather industry